Burns is a city in Marion County, Kansas, United States.  The city name came from a nearby train station, which was named prior to the city being incorporated.  As of the 2020 census, the population of the city was 234.  It is located between El Dorado and Florence along the west side of U.S. Route 77 highway.  The south edge of the city is the border of Marion and Butler counties.

History

Early history

For many millennia, the Great Plains of North America was inhabited by nomadic Native Americans.  From the 16th century to 18th century, the Kingdom of France claimed ownership of large parts of North America.  In 1762, after the French and Indian War, France secretly ceded New France to Spain, per the Treaty of Fontainebleau.

19th century
In 1802, Spain returned most of the land to France.  In 1803, most of the land for modern day Kansas was acquired by the United States from France as part of the 828,000 square mile Louisiana Purchase for 2.83 cents per acre.

In 1854, the Kansas Territory was organized, then in 1861 Kansas became the 34th U.S. state.  In 1855, Marion County was established within the Kansas Territory, which included the land for modern day Burns.

In 1877, the Florence, El Dorado, and Walnut Valley Railroad Company built a branch line from Florence to El Dorado, and a station called Burns was built north of the present city location.  In 1881, the rail line was extended to Douglass, then later to Arkansas City.  The line was leased and operated by the Atchison, Topeka and Santa Fe Railway.  The line from Florence through Burns to El Dorado was abandoned in 1942.  The original branch line connected Florence through El Dorado to Arkansas City.

At the present location, a city named St. Francis was platted in August 1880. When the town incorporated, they discovered the official city name of St. Francis was already taken, so they changed the name to be the same as the nearby Burns train station, then soon afterward the station was moved into the new city. The original station was named after a railroad company official.

A post office was established in Burns on November 30, 1880.

20th century
Burns High School was closed in 1965 as a result of statewide school district consolidation.  Burns Elementary & Junior High School closed in 1997 due to the lack of funds.  Education is currently provided by Peabody–Burns USD 398 public school district in Peabody.

21st century
In 2010, the Keystone-Cushing Pipeline (Phase II) was constructed 6.5 miles west of Burns, north to south through Marion County, with much controversy over road damage, tax exemption, and environmental concerns (if a leak ever occurs).  A pumping station named Burns was built 2 miles north of Potwin.

Geography
Burns is located at coordinates 38.0902957, -96.8864144 in the scenic Flint Hills and Great Plains of the state of Kansas. The south city limits of Burns is the county line shared between Marion County and Butler County.

Climate
The climate in this area is characterized by hot, humid summers and generally mild to cool winters.  According to the Köppen Climate Classification system, Burns has a humid subtropical climate, abbreviated "Cfa" on climate maps.

Demographics

2010 census
As of the census of 2010, there were 228 people, 93 households, and 59 families residing in the city. The racial makeup of the city was 96.9% White, 1.3% African American, 0.4% Native American, 0.4% Pacific Islander, and 0.9% from two or more races. Hispanic or Latino of any race were 0.9% of the population.

There were 93 households, of which 29.0% had children under the age of 18 living with them, 51.6% were married couples living together, 7.5% had a female householder with no husband present, 4.3% had a male householder with no wife present, and 36.6% were non-families. 32.3% of all households were made up of individuals, and 16.2% had someone living alone who was 65 years of age or older. The average household size was 2.45 and the average family size was 3.14.

The median age in the city was 38 years. 25% of residents were under the age of 18; 8.8% were between the ages of 18 and 24; 23.2% were from 25 to 44; 27.1% were from 45 to 64; and 15.8% were 65 years of age or older. The gender makeup of the city was 53.9% male and 46.1% female.

2000 census
As of the census of 2000, there were 268 people, 101 households, and 79 families residing in the city. The racial makeup of the city was 98.51% White, 0.75% African American and 0.75% Native American.

There were 101 households, out of which 36.6% had children under the age of 18 living with them, 63.4% were married couples living together, 10.9% had a female householder with no husband present, and 20.8% were non-families. 17.8% of all households were made up of individuals, and 6.9% had someone living alone who was 65 years of age or older. The average household size was 2.65 and the average family size was 2.94.

In the city, the population was spread out, with 29.1% under the age of 18, 8.2% from 18 to 24, 29.5% from 25 to 44, 17.5% from 45 to 64, and 15.7% who were 65 years of age or older. The median age was 36 years. For every 100 females, there were 107.8 males. For every 100 females age 18 and over, there were 102.1 males.

As of 2000 the median income for a household in the city was $33,500, and the median income for a family was $39,000. Males had a median income of $22,143 versus $21,250 for females. The per capita income for the city was $11,990. About 7.5% of families and 11.9% of the population were below the poverty line, including 15.8% of those under the age of eighteen and 9.8% of those 65 or over.

Government
The Burns government consists of a mayor and five council members.  The council meets once a month.  As of January 2022, the mayor is Mike Hammann.

Education

Public
The community is served by Peabody–Burns USD 398 public school district.  All students attend schools in Peabody at two schools:
 Peabody-Burns Junior/Senior High School, located in Peabody.
 Peabody-Burns Elementary School, located in Peabody.

Peabody-Burns High School Sports Championships
 1977, 2nd Place, Class 2A, High School Boys Football, Head Coach Dennis Franchione.

Historical Burns Schools
 Burns High School, southeast corner of Main and Cincinnati.  It was closed in 1965 as a result of statewide school district consolidation, then converted into the Burns Community Museum.  The school mascot was Burns Hornets.  It was the first consolidated grade school and high school in Kansas, and was the first to use a school "bus" in Kansas, which were special-order wagons in 1904.  It is currently listed on the National Register of Historic Places (NRHP). (NRHP), 
 Burns Elementary & Junior High School, southwest corner of Main and Church. It was closed in 1997 due to the lack of funds, then demolished.

Burns High School Sports Championships
 1953, Class B, 1st Place, High School Boys Basketball, Head Coach Harvey Loy.

Private
 Eden Christian School, Private Mennonite Grade School, approximately 3 miles south of Burns. Located at

Library
The city is served by the Burns Public Library at 104 North Washington Avenue. The library is a member of the North Central Kansas Libraries System.

Media

Print
 Peabody Gazette-Bulletin, local newspaper for Burns, Florence, Peabody.
 Hillsboro Free Press, free newspaper for greater Marion County area.
 The El Dorado Times, regional newspaper from El Dorado.

Radio
Burns is served by numerous radio stations of the Wichita-Hutchinson listening market area, and satellite radio.  See Media in Wichita, Kansas.

Television
Burns is served by over-the-air ATSC digital TV of the Wichita-Hutchinson viewing market area, cable TV by Allegiance Communications, and satellite TV.  See Media in Wichita, Kansas.

Film
 Mars Attacks!, 1996 comedy science fiction movie, the Perkinsville scenes from this movie was filmed around Burns, such as the bus stop scene, cemetery scene, donut shop scenes, and trailer park scenes.  The beginning cattle segment was filmed near Leon, and the retirement community was filmed in northeast Wichita.   A city sign next to the highway was given to the city by Warner Brothers company.

Infrastructure

Transportation
U.S. 77 highway runs north-south on the east side of Burns, and follows roughly parallel to the old railway.

See also
 National Register of Historic Places listings in Marion County, Kansas
 Historical Maps of Marion County, Kansas

References

Further reading

 Burns, Kansas: 100-Years, 1880-1980.; Burns Centennial Committee; 1980.
 Days to Remember: The Burns Community, 1864-1970; Hazel C. Bruner; Mennonite Press; 1970.

External links

 
 Burns - Directory of Public Officials, League of Kansas Municipalities
 Historic Images of Burns, Special Photo Collections at Wichita State University Library.
 Burns city map, KDOT
 Topo Map of Burns area, USGS

Cities in Kansas
Cities in Marion County, Kansas
Populated places established in 1880
1880 establishments in Kansas